is a former Japanese football player.

Playing career
Saikawa was born in Sapporo on June 10, 1985. After graduating from high school, he joined J2 League club Consadole Sapporo in 2004. On August 29, he debuted as substitute forward from the 70th minutes against Ventforet Kofu. However he could only play this match and retired end of 2004 season.

Club statistics

References

External links

1985 births
Living people
Association football people from Hokkaido
Sportspeople from Sapporo
Japanese footballers
J2 League players
Hokkaido Consadole Sapporo players
Association football forwards